Matthew Terence Smith (born 14 October 1982) is an Australian  association football manager and former player. He was born in England, he represented the Australia national team.

Born in England, Smith emigrated to Australia where he started his professional soccer career with North Queensland Fury during the 2009-10 A-League season and then signed a two-year contract with Brisbane Roar at the start of the A-League 2010–11 season. He has played for the Australian national team, and coached Brisbane City FC out of NPL Queensland in 2020, as The Azzurri were relegated into the FQPL in 2021. The Azzurri return in NPL Queensland in 2022.

Club career
Born in Chichester, England, Smith started his career playing University football in England, where he represented several different Universities before being signed by Championship club Portsmouth.

Smith moved to Australia for one year in 2004 and returned in 2006, during which time he attended Hartpury College in Gloucestershire and completed his master's degree in Sports Management. He also captained the Hartpury senior side to the BUSA National Championship in 2007.

He moved to Australia and played for Palm Beach before moving to Brisbane Strikers. He was signed on an injury replacement loan at North Queensland Fury to replace Scottish defender Scott Wilson.

Brisbane Roar
On 16 April 2010 it was announced that Smith joined the Brisbane Roar on a two-year deal after his contract with North Queensland expired due to ownership changes. On 6 September 2011, the Roar announced that Smith would replace departed midfielder Matt McKay as captain of the club. On 10 September 2012, Smith signed a new 3-year contract at the Roar, extending his stay until the end of the 2015/16 season.

Bangkok Glass
It was announced in December 2014 that Smith would leave the Brisbane Roar and join Bangkok Glass for an undisclosed fee.

Kitchee
On 31 December 2018, Smith moved to Hong Kong Premier League club Kitchee.

On 12 February 2019, in the third qualifying match of the 2019 Asian Champions League, Kitchee played away to Perak. During the match, Matt Smith was sent off after picking up his second yellow card in the 49th minute. Kitchee lost the match on penalties in the end.

Return to Australia 
On 1 July 2019, National Premier Leagues Queensland side Gold Coast Knights SC announced the signing of Smith.

Personal
Smith married Aicha Bendjelloul, an English woman on 17 May 2012 in a civil ceremony in Brisbane, Australia. They then celebrated with family and friends by hosting a party on the Thai island of Koh Samui.

Together, they have 4 children Isla, Ava, Ruby and Owen. Smith is qualified with a BA Degree in Marketing and Leisure Management and a Masters in Sports Management from Hartpury College in Gloucestershire.

A-League statistics

1 - includes A-League final series statistics
2 - includes FIFA Club World Cup statistics; AFC Champions League statistics are included in season commencing after group stages (i.e. ACL and A-League seasons etc.)

Managerial statistics

 Results from penalty shoot-outs are counted as draws in this table.

Honours

Player

Club
Brisbane Strikers
 Queensland State League Premiership: 2009

Brisbane Roar
 A-League Championship: 2010–11, 2011–12, 2013–14
 A-League Premiership: 2010–11, 2013–14

Kitchee
 Hong Kong Senior Shield: 2018–19
 Hong Kong FA Cup: 2018–19

Gold Coast Knights
NPL Queensland Championship: 2019

Brisbane City 

 Football Queensland Premier League Premiership: 2021
 Football Queensland Premier League Championship: 2021

Manager

Brisbane City 

 Football Queensland Premier League Premiership: 2021
 Football Queensland Premier League Championship: 2021

Individual
 PFA A-League Team of the Season: 2010–11, 2013–14
Football Queensland Premier League Team of the Season: 2021
Football Queensland Premier League Coach of the Year: 2021
 A-League All Star: 2014

References

External links
 Brisbane Roar profile 

 Matt Smith Interview
 From Brisbane to Bangkok for former Roar captain Matt Smith

1982 births
Living people
Sportspeople from Chichester
Australian soccer players
Australia international soccer players
English footballers
English emigrants to Australia
Association football central defenders
Gloucester City A.F.C. players
Portsmouth F.C. players
Chichester City F.C. players
Cirencester Town F.C. players
Gold Coast City FC players
Brisbane Strikers FC players
Northern Fury FC players
Brisbane Roar FC players
Matt Smith
Kitchee SC players
A-League Men players
Matt Smith
Australian expatriate soccer players
English expatriate footballers
Australian expatriate sportspeople in Thailand
Expatriate footballers in Thailand